The Madison Museum of Contemporary Art  (MMoCA), formerly known as the Madison Art Center, is an independent, non-profit art museum located in downtown Madison, Wisconsin.

MMoCA is dedicated to exhibiting, collecting, and preserving modern and contemporary art. Its mission is to educate and inspire by means of rotating permanent collection exhibitions, special exhibitions, film series, and educational programming. The museum opened in its current home adjacent to the Overture Center for the Arts on April 23, 2006. Both MMoCA and the Overture Center were designed by world-renowned architect César Pelli.

History
MMoCA is one of Madison's oldest cultural organizations. Established as the Madison Art Association in 1901, the organization presented education programs and exhibitions in borrowed spaces. In 1964, the organization leased the former Lincoln School on Lake Mendota and merged with the Madison Art Foundation to become the Madison Art Center.

In 1980, the Madison Art Center moved into the Madison Civic Center. In 2003, the Art Center’s name was changed to the Madison Museum of Contemporary Art (MMoCA) to more accurately reflect the museum’s ongoing mission.

Controversies

2019 Chroma Event 
In 2019, Madison Museum of Contemporary Art (MMoCA) became the center of a controversial community dialogue after posting a Call for Artists for an unpaid exhibition opportunity. Equity for Artists, an artist-led response, published an open letter claiming that this call exemplified how the museum “perpetuates… systemic problems that hurt artists and obstruct diversity in the field.”

Starting in 2018, the Chroma exhibition was a ticketed fundraising event featuring a colorful art experience and DJs. In their open letter, Equity for Artists decried the $25 application fee and $100 installation fee for an unpaid one-night exhibition opportunity. They added: “Additionally, all participating artists agree to allow MMoCA the free use of images taken of their artwork for perpetuity.”

Following the open letter, and after an offsite discussion between the artists, museum staff and leadership, MMoCA published a statement revising the terms of the event: waiving artist fees; providing installation support at no charge; and offering paid honorariums of $100. They wrote, “MMoCA is staffed by human beings and sometimes, our best intentions are off pitch. It was never the intent of the museum to put an undue burden on artists participating in Chroma.”

2022 Wisconsin Triennial Exhibition 
The Wisconsin Triennial is a triennial exhibition and survey of contemporary artists in Wisconsin. The Triennial began as a biennial in 1978 at MMoCA’s predecessor, the Madison Art Center, and became a triennial in 1987.

The 2022 Wisconsin Triennial exhibition became controversial after the majority of the exhibiting artists published an open letter protesting the museum’s director, Christina Brungardt, along with the board of directors, and their decisions relative to multiple incidents before and during the exhibition.

The curatorial theme of the 2022 Wisconsin Triennial, “Ain’t I A Woman?”  exclusively focused on the work of black or African American women, femmes and gender nonconforming artists in Wisconsin. This triennial exhibition was the first to be curated by a guest curator and the first to pay exhibiting artists honorariums.

In an open letter published on FWDTruth.com, a collective of the artists denounced two incidents involving another triennial artist, Lilada Gee: once after a “verbal attack” by a former employee of the Overture Center for the Arts and another where her artwork was damaged and removed by visitors. Following the second incident, the museum director reportedly intervened to “de-escalate” the situation by asking Gee if the guests who had marred the work could also keep it.

In their open letter published on August 19, 2022, the collective of artists in MMoCA’s 2022 Wisconsin Triennial presented a list of concerns including policy and contract violations, unfair compensation, unequal distribution of resources, and repeated onsite disrespect and harms, especially to Lilada Gee. The collective artists wrote that: “Well before the works of these artists rested in their designated places at MMoCA, the Madison Museum of Contemporary Art’s leadership has failed to demonstrate meaningful care for this exhibition and its participants by both failing to secure against outside harm and repeatedly perpetrating internal institutional harm.”

Over half of the artists withdrew from the exhibition in protest over the last three months of the scheduled six-month exhibition, citing indications of misogynoir and institutional racism. “I don’t know that there’s anything that they could do now that would change how I feel about what’s happening,” Portia Cobb said. “The response now is basically underscoring their own supremacist and patriarchal standards. But I’m really proud to be part of this collective voice — it’s motivated us to understand what our power is, as individuals and as a collective.” 

In a response published on August 24, 2022, MMoCA’s executive committee called the criticisms “inappropriate and unfounded accusations of institutional racism [addressing] their handling of this unique situation.” They continue: “the 16-minute period during which hired gallery attendants were not in one part of the exhibit space does not equate to disrespect for the Black artists or guest curator of the exhibit, nor does it point to institutional racism.”

Facilities
Made possible by the philanthropy of W. Jerome Frautschi and Pleasant T. Rowland, MMoCA encompasses 51,500 square feet of interior space, including highly flexible gallery spaces. MMoCA's primary art and gallery spaces are:
 
The Henry Street Gallery (lower level)
Lobby (first floor)
The State Street Gallery (first floor)
The Shop (first floor)
The Main Galleries (second floor)
The Imprint Gallery (second floor)
Sculpture Garden (rooftop/seasonal)
Also included are a 230-seat lecture hall, an education classroom, a study center for drawings, prints, and photographs. Fresco, the rooftop restaurant, closed in 2021.

Collection and exhibitions

Collection 
The permanent collection includes nearly 6,000 objects, comprising one of the nation’s finest collections of Chicago Imagism as well as significant holdings in Mexican Modernist prints, Wisconsin-based artists, and contemporary photography.

Of the more than 1,400 artists in MMoCA's permanent collection, included are Romare Bearden, Deborah Butterfield, Alexander Calder, Sonya Clark, Sam Gilliam, Guerrilla Girls, Frida Kahlo, Jin Soo Kim, Jacob Lawrence, Robert Mapplethorpe, Gladys Nilsson, José Clemente Orozco, Ed Paschke, Christina Ramberg, Cindy Sherman, Kiki Smith, Kara Walker, Andy Warhol, John Wilde, and Wesley Willis.

Depending on current exhibitions, a rotating selection of permanent collection work normally remains on view.

Exhibitions 
Exhibitions are the cornerstone of MMoCA's public programs and have featured many of the most respected artists of the last century, including Louise Bourgeois, Cecelia Condit, Tacita Dean, Jeffrey Gibson, Jasper Johns, Brad Kahlhamer, Alice Neel, Shirin Neshat, Rashaad Newsome, Georgia O'Keeffe, Claes Oldenburg, Nathaniel Mary Quinn, Robert Rauschenberg, Faith Ringgold, Peter Saul, George Segal, Alec Soth, Frank Stella, Do Ho Suh, and Ursula von Rydingsvard.

The main galleries, located on the second floor, host the museum's major exhibitions. The Imprint Gallery, also on the second floor, is a small black box theater dedicated to time-based media, multimedia, and special installations. The State Street Gallery on the first floor offers a changing roster of special exhibitions and installations, while The Henry Street Gallery on the lower level presents selections and exhibitions from the museum's permanent collection. The Shop (as in, "workshop"), on the first floor, is dedicated to hosting interactive exhibitions and community events. MMoCA's rooftop Sculpture Garden presents major 3D works and installations on a rotating basis in an illuminated, outdoor garden setting.

Admission and funding

MMoCA is free to the public.

As a free-admission museum, MMoCA relies on individuals, corporations, private event rentals, and foundations for necessary financial support. Key support is also provided by museum memberships, fundraising events like the annual Art Fair on the Square, and private gifts and donations.

See also
Overture Center
List of contemporary art museums
List of museums in Wisconsin

References

External links
Madison Museum of Contemporary Art official website

Museums in Madison, Wisconsin
Art museums and galleries in Wisconsin
Contemporary art galleries in the United States
Modern art museums in the United States
Museums established in 1901
1901 establishments in Wisconsin
Race-related controversies
Anti-black racism